58th Cinema Audio Society Awards
March 19, 2022

Motion Picture - Live Action:
Dune
The 58th Cinema Audio Society Awards were held on March 19, 2022, at the InterContinental in Los Angeles, to honor outstanding achievements in sound mixing in film and television of 2021. The nominations were announced on January 25, 2022.

Winners and nominees
The winners are listed first and in bold.

Film

Television

Special Awards
Filmmaker Award
 Ridley Scott

Career Achievement Award
 Paul Massey

References

2021 film awards
2021 television awards
Cinema Audio Society Awards
2021 in American cinema